Christopher Neville Pope is the Distinguished Professor of Physics and Astronomy and the Stephen Hawking Chair of Fundamental Physics at Texas A&M University.

In 1976, Pope graduated with B.S. from Clare College, Cambridge and was awarded the Tyson Medal. From St John's College, Cambridge he received in 1979 his M.A. and in 1980 his Ph.D. His doctoral thesis Instantons in quantum gravity was written under the supervision of Stephen Hawking.

References

Year of birth missing (living people)
Living people
21st-century American physicists
Alumni of Clare College, Cambridge
Alumni of St John's College, Cambridge
Texas A&M University faculty